Boyat (also, Bayat) is a village and municipality in the Ujar Rayon of Azerbaijan.  It has a population of 2,404.

References 

Populated places in Ujar District